The Muhoroni Stadium previously called Biafra Stadium is a multi-purpose stadium in Muhoroni, Kenya.  It used mostly for football matches and is the home stadium of Muhoroni Youth of the Kenyan Premier League since 2012  

The stadium holds 20,000 people and is owned by  Muhoroni Youth Football Club. The Clubs Champion partner is Muhoroni Sugar Company who donated the land to the community. The company though in receivership management is a leading  Brown Sugar manufacturer from which Muhoroni sugar is derived.

Football venues in Kenya
Sport in Nyanza Province
Multi-purpose stadiums in Kenya